Ermesinde of Luxembourg ( – 24 June 1143) was a German noblewoman.

Life 
She was a daughter of Count Conrad I of Luxembourg and his wife Clementia of Aquitaine.  After the death of her nephew Conrad II in 1136, there were no surviving males in the House of Ardennes-Verdun and she inherited the counties of Luxembourg and Longwy.  However, she immediately abdicated in favour of her son Henry IV and never actually ruled.

She is primarily known because she made a number of donations to churches and monasteries.  Towards the end of her life, she retired to a monastery.

First marriage 
In 1096, Ermesinde married Albert of Moha ( – 24 August 1098), Count of Dagsburg, Eguisheim, Metz and Moha, and vogt of Altorf.  This was his second marriage; he had earlier been married to Heilwig of Eguisheim.  From his first marriage, he had a son named Hugh, who would later succeed him.  Albert and Ermesinde had two daughters together:
 Matilda (d. after 1157), married Count Folmar of Metz and Hombourg, who in 1135 founded the Abbey of Beaupré
 Unknown daughter, married a Count Aiulf, who is only known from a deed of 1124, in which Ermesinde calls her grandson Eberhard "son of Count Aiulf".

Second marriage 
In 1109, Ermesinde remarried to Godfrey I, Count of Namur, the oldest son of Albert III, Count of Namur.  This was his second marriage, too; he had earlier been married to Sibylle of Porcien.  He had two daughters from his first marriage; which ended in divorce in 1104, when Sibylle was pregnant from her lover Engelram I of Coucy.

Godfrey and Ermesinde had the following children together:
 Albert (d. after 1125)
 Henry, who was Count of Luxembourg as Henry IV and Count of Namur as Henry I
 Clemencia, married Duke Conrad I of Zähringen
 Beatrix ( – 1160), married Count Ithier, Count of Rethel of Rethel
 Adelaide (1124 – end of July 1169), married Count Baldwin IV of Hainaut

Counts of Luxembourg
Countesses of Luxembourg
Ermesinde
German countesses
11th-century German nobility
12th-century German nobility
1080s births
1143 deaths
Year of birth uncertain
11th-century German women
12th-century German women